Hazel Keener (October 22, 1904 – August 7, 1979) was a motion 
picture actress from Fairbury, Illinois. She was raised in Davenport, Iowa.

Keener won a national beauty contest sponsored by the Chicago Tribune and used her success to begin a film career in Hollywood. She was a blonde, 5 feet 6 inches in height, 128 lbs., with a slender, athletic build. Her hair was chestnut brown and she had gray eyes.

Career
In 1923 Hazel was selected as the prettiest woman in the motion picture capitol, Hollywood. Miss Hollywood was chosen at the annual musical comedy fete given by Hollywood painters, sculptors, writers, and composers. As tribute to Miss Keener's beauty, her bust was sculpted by sculptor Finn Haaken Frolich for the Norse club. She was a 1924 WAMPAS Baby Star, chosen among young actresses destined for stardom.

Her acting career endured from 1922 through 1956. Her first role of importance came in the Harold Lloyd comedy, The Freshman (1925). Hazel played the second feminine lead. She was active as an actress in the late 1920s with roles in movies like The Gingham Girl (1927), Whispering Sage (1927), The Silent Partner (1927), and Vanishing Hoofs (1926). In the 1930s, 1940s, and early 1950s Miss Keener had small parts in approximately twenty movies. She acted in television with roles in episodes of Judge Roy Bean (1956) and Hopalong Cassidy (1954).

Death
Hazel Keener died in 1979 in Pacific Grove, California, aged 74, of a heart attack.

Partial filmography

 The Married Flapper (1922)
 The Brass Bottle (1923)
 Galloping Gallagher (1924)
 North of Nevada (1924)
 The Silent Stranger (1924)
 The Mask of Lopez (1924)
 His Forgotten Wife (1924)
 The Dangerous Coward (1924)
 The Fighting Sap (1924)
 Empty Hands (1924)
 Ports of Call (1925)
 Parisian Love (1925)
 The Freshman (1925)
 Vanishing Hoofs (1926)
 One Hour of Love (1927)
 Whispering Sage (1927)
 The First Night (1927)
 The Gingham Girl (1927)
 That Gang of Mine (1940)
 Murder by Invitation (1941)

References
The Davenport, Iowa Democrat and Leader, Hazel Keener Chosen Queen of Hollywood, Sunday Morning, May 27, 1923, Page 22.
The Davenport Democrat and Leader, Friends Of Our Hazel Pack The Garden Sunday, Monday Evening, July 2, 1923, Page 3.
The Davenport Democrat and Leader, Hazel Keener Will Be Seen In Lloyd Picture At Garden, September 17, 1925, Page 3.
The Lincoln, Nebraska Sunday Star, Answers To Movie Fans, Sunday, July 5, 1925, Page 9.

External links 

 

American film actresses
American silent film actresses
Actors from Davenport, Iowa
American television actresses
Keener Hazel
Keener Hazel
20th-century American actresses
People from Bettendorf, Iowa
WAMPAS Baby Stars
Western (genre) film actresses